Heart of Brazil is an album by Eddie Daniels, released in 2018.

Track listing
 "Lôro (Parrot)" (5:08)
 "Baião Malandro (Badass Baião)" (5:51)
 "Água e Vinho (Water and Wine)" (6:07)
 "Ciranda (Folk Dance)" (5:11)
 "Folia (Revelry)" (4:23)
 "Maracatú (Sacred Rhythm)" (5:52)
 "Adágio" 5:59
 "Tango Nova (New Tango)" (5:45)
 "Chôro" (6:02)
 "Tango" (4:40)
 "Cigana (Gypsy Woman)" (7:36)
 "Trem Noturno (Night Train)" (7:44)
 "Auto-Retrato (Self-Portrait)" (6:44)

References

2018 albums
Jazz albums by American artists